Malcolm McCullough (born June 1, 1957) is a professor at the University of Michigan's Taubman College of Architecture and Urban Planning.  He has lectured widely on Urban Computing and place-based Interaction Design.

Bibliography
 Downtime on the Microgrid, MIT Press, 2020.
 Ambient Commons, MIT Press, 2014.
 Digital Ground, MIT Press, 2004.
 Abstracting Craft, 1996.
 Digital Design Media, 1994.
 The Electronic Design Studio, 1990.

References

External links
 McCullough's website at University of Michigan

University of Michigan faculty
American computer scientists
Living people
1957 births